Kennishead railway station is a railway station in Kennishead, a district of Glasgow, Scotland.

Facilities
The station is unmanned and has only basic amenities (waiting shelters, bench seating and a customer help point on each platform).  Train running information is also offered via digital CIS displays, timetable posters and automated announcements.  No level access is available to either platform – both entrances have steep ramps from the street and the footbridge linking them has steps.

Three bike racks can also be located on Platform 2, which are uncovered.

Services 

The station has a half-hourly service in each direction on weekdays (hourly in the evenings which extends to Kilmarnock, one of which Monday to Friday only extends to Dumfries), to Glasgow and /Kilmarnock, alternating every 30 minutes.

Kilmarnock services run through this station non-stop every hour in each direction during the day, only stopping at Barrhead and Glasgow Central.

As of 19th February 2023, on Sundays there is an hourly service in each direction between Glasgow Central and Kilmarnock, calling all stations, with one of these services extending to Carlisle.

References

Notes

Sources 
 
 

Railway stations in Glasgow
Former Glasgow, Barrhead and Kilmarnock Joint Railway stations
Railway stations in Great Britain opened in 1848
SPT railway stations
Railway stations served by ScotRail